Alford T. Welch is a Professor of Religious Studies at Michigan State University. Welch got his Ph.D. degree in Arabic and Islamic Studies from the University of Edinburgh in 1970. He also holds a M.Div. degree on Biblical language, literature and Near Eastern history from Southern Baptist Theological Seminary. Welch's research areas include History of religions, and Arabic and Islamic studies.

References

External links 
 Homepage

Year of birth missing (living people)
Living people
Religious studies scholars
Alumni of the University of Edinburgh
Michigan State University faculty